Flusilazole (DPX-H6573) is an organosilicon fungicide invented by DuPont, which is used to control fungal infections on a variety of fruit and vegetable crops. It is moderately toxic to animals and has been shown to produce birth defects in high doses.

External links

References

Fungicides
Organosilicon compounds
Embryotoxicants
Fluoroarenes